The 2015 Big East Conference softball tournament was held at The Ballpark at Rosemont in Rosemont, Illinois. The tournament, hosted by DePaul University, ran May 8 through May 9, 2015 and determined the champion for the Big East Conference for the 2015 NCAA Division I softball season.  Top-seeded  won the tournament for the first time and earned the Big East Conference's automatic bid to the 2015 NCAA Division I softball tournament. The entire tournament was broadcast on Fox Sports 2. Eric Collins and Brooke Weisbrod served as the broadcasters for Fox.

Format and seeding
The top four teams from the conference's round-robin regular season qualified for the tournament, and were seeded one through four.  They played a single-elimination tournament.  Villanova claimed the fourth seed by tiebreaker over Butler.

Tournament

All-Tournament Team
The following players were named to the All-Tournament Team.

Most Outstanding Player
Krystal Puga was named Tournament Most Outstanding Player.  Puga was an infielder for St. John's.

References

Big East Tournament
Big East Conference softball tournament
Big East Conference softball tournament